"Ark of Suffering" is a song by the American thrash metal band Tourniquet. One of the band's best known songs from their early years, "Ark of Suffering" is the third track from Tourniquet's 1990 debut album Stop the Bleeding. It is widely known for its stance on animal abuse and the music video which contained graphic material on the subject. "Ark of Suffering" is still an almost constant part of the band's live set list, frequently as the opening or closing song.

Overview
Written by the band's co-founder and drummer Ted Kirkpatrick, "Ark of Suffering" has a more serious and darker atmosphere compared to rest of the album's songs. It is the only song on the album to feature the guitarist Gary Lenaire sharing his shouting vocals with the melodic ones of Guy Ritter.

"Ark of Suffering" begins with a fast and aggressive, full-on thrash metal intro that lasts 6 seconds, featuring minimalist thrash riffing and d-beat drumming. The music stops for a few seconds, followed by an interlude of just the lead guitar playing, and at 0:19 the drums step in again. The song pauses for a second while the aggressive shouting vocals of Gary Lenaire comes in accompanied by a vocal effect, and the song keeps going with the whole band playing. Lenaire sings: "You think it's alright to destroy God's creation..." At 0:45 the tempo becomes slower, and the melodic baritone vocals of Guy Ritter take place, singing: "Do you think dominate means to kill just for sport..." At 1:14, the tempo becomes faster accompanied by double bass drumming, and Lenaire's shouting vocals replace Ritter again: "Don't you see in their eyes how they trust us..." At 1:36 Ritter's vocals come in for the slower part. At 1:52, Mark Lewis plays a guitar solo, from 2:15 to 2:35 the band plays an aggressive, rhythmic and instrumental interlude, followed by a second virtuosic guitar solo by Mark Lewis, with Lenaire playing the third solo from 2:55. A calmer interlude starts at 3:14, playing a complex riff till 3:30, when Ritter whispers: "Before they die..." Then with a deep baritone voice: "Who will hear their cry." — with "cry" sang with Ritter's high-pitched and twisted falsetto voice. The guitars play 2 atonal riffs around 3:50, creating an oppressive atmosphere, a shredding lead at 4:00, and the songs ends at 4:14.

Theme 
"Ark of Suffering" is about man's responsibility for taking care of animals.  The song takes a Biblical point of view on the subject, implying how God has given man the right to dominate the creatures in the world, but has to answer for his wrongings for God. The lyrics point out several examples of animal abuse such as canned hunts, raising them to only to be made for fur and leather coats, circus training, taking animals as pets and abandoning them once they are no longer young, laboratory tests, locking in cages in meat houses, and cutting them for educational purposes. According to the liner notes of the album, Ted Kirkpatrick felt strongly about the subject, and has written:

Music video
A music video was shot for the song. The video included the guitarist Erik Mendez and bassist Victor Macias, and Mendez is shown playing the leads of the session musician Mark Lewis. On the video, the band performs at a studio environment, and the looks of Guy Ritter and Gary Lenaire have a slight glam metal touch with their eye mascaras. The additional video material include violent footage of hunting, laboratory tests, meat houses and other situations portraying animal abuse. On the video, a visual performance art is done by Devino, portraying the agony of the abused animals.

The video received airplay on MTV for a while before it was banned by for being too graphic. The video won the Christian News Forum Contemporary Christian Music Award for "Rock Video of the Year" and it was voted by the Heaven's Metal magazine's readers as their "Favorite Video of the Year".  The video is also included on the Ocular Digital DVD.

Ritter has said about the song airplay:

Personnel 
Tourniquet
 Guy Ritter - Vocals
 Gary Lenaire - Guitars, Vocals
 Ted Kirkpatrick - Drums

Additional Musicians
 Mark Lewis - Lead Guitars
 Erik Jan James - Bass

Production
 Bill Metoyer - Producer

Video
 Erik Mendez - Lead Guitars
 Victor Macias - Bass
 Devino - Firebreathing

References 

Tourniquet (band) songs
1990 songs
Songs about animal rights